The 2018 NCAA Division I men's soccer championship game was the final game of the 2018 NCAA Division I Men's Soccer Tournament, determining the national champion for the 2018 NCAA Division I men's soccer season. The match was played on December 9, 2018 at Harder Stadium in Santa Barbara, California, a soccer-specific stadium that is home to UC Santa Barbara Gauchos men's and women's soccer programs.

The match was contested between the 2018 MAC Men's Soccer Tournament champions, Akron, and the Big Ten Tournament, semifinalists, Maryland. Maryland ultimately won the match 1-0 thanks to a penalty kick goal from Amar Sejdić in the 57th minute of play. Sejdić was named the tournament's Most Outstanding Player for his performance. Maryland went through the entire tournament without conceding a single goal. 

Marked by the media as a "redemption final", the final features two men's soccer heavyweights: Akron and Maryland. Both teams, while regularly successful over the last two decades, have not won an NCAA title in nearly a decade each. During the 2018 campaign, both programs had a slump early on in the season that nearly saw both teams miss out on the NCAA Tournament. A late season resurgence by both programs allowed both to reach the NCAA final.

The three-time defending champions, Stanford, were eliminated in the quarterfinals by Akron. The match was broadcast on ESPN2.

Road to the final 

The NCAA Division I Men's Soccer Tournament, sometimes known as the College Cup, is an American intercollegiate soccer tournament conducted by the National Collegiate Athletic Association (NCAA), and determines the Division I men's national champion. The tournament has been formally held since 1959, when it was an eight-team tournament. Since then, the tournament has expanded to 48 teams, in which every Division I conference tournament champion is allocated a berth. The tournament was the first final since 2014 to not feature Stanford in the match. It was Akron's first appearance since 2010, which they won their lone NCAA title against Louisville, and Maryland's first appearance since 2013, where they lost to Notre Dame. Maryland has won the NCAA Tournament on three previous occasions: 1968, 2005, and 2008.

Akron 

Akron entered the championship match on a nine-match winning streak, with their last defeat coming on October 20 at Northern Illinois. The program began the season ranked fourth in the nation in the United Soccer Coaches poll and second in the nation in the TopDrawer Soccer poll. A slow start to the season saw the Zips fall to a 1–3–1 record and slip out of the national rankings. Following the early skid, the Zips rebounded to win their next three straight matches. This was hallmarked by a 10–0 victory of Canisius, making it the program's largest win in history. Akron earned a pair of subsequent road wins at Grand Canyon and at VCU.

Akron began conference play with a scoreless draw at Bowling Green. A chain of inconsistent performances saw the Zips lose at home to West Virginia and Syracuse, but nab victories against Michigan State and Creighton, who were both ranked in the USC Top 10 at the time.

The Zips finished the Mid-American Conference regular season in fourth place, making it the programs poorest regular season performance in MAC play since joining the conference. In the MAC Tournament, the Zips had a season resurgence, winning all of their tournament matches in regulation, en route to their 7th straight Mid-American Conference Men's Soccer Tournament title, and their 11th MAC title in the last 14 years. The championship was a rematch of last year's championship, where the Zips took on Western Michigan. The win guaranteed that the Zips would return to the NCAA Tournament, where their chances prior to the tournament had been on the bubble.

The Zips did not earn a seed in the NCAA Tournament for the first time since 2013. In the first round, Akron hosted Rider, where they won 3–1. The victory led to a rematch against Syracuse. The match, played at nearby Colgate University, was a triumph for Akron, as they won by the same 3–1 score. The Zips then took on top-seed Wake Forest in the Sweet Sixteen, and earned a 1–0 away victory. In the Elite Eight, Akron took on Stanford, the three-time defending NCAA champions. Akron had been eliminated in penalties for the last 2 tournaments by Stanford. In the match, Akron avenged their losses, and won 3–2 at Stanford booking their spot in the College Cup. There, the Zips prevailed 5–1 against Michigan State, making it the most lopsided semifinal match in nearly 20 years.

Maryland

Pre-match

Venue selection
The National Collegiate Athletic Association determined the host of the final on April 18, 2017. The announcement of Meredith Field at Harder Stadium was in conjunction with WakeMed Soccer Park being announced as the 2019 and 2021 College Cup venue, while Harder Stadium would host the College Cup again in 2020.

Analysis 
Ahead of the match, both programs had a similar storyline of having a late season resurgence. Akron was considered by some to be the favorite given their longer run of form, and their emphatic win over Michigan State.

Match

Details

Statistics

References

Championship Game
2018
Akron Zips men's soccer
Maryland Terrapins men's soccer
2018 in sports in California
December 2018 sports events in the United States